The Dabrazhin Formation (Russian: Dabrazinskaya Svita) preserves dinosaur fossils in Kazakhstan. There are indeterminate remains of sauropods, nodosaurs, ornithomimosaurs, and other reptiles.

The strata date back to the Late Cretaceous. Dinosaur remains are among the fossils that have been recovered from the formation.

Fossil content 

 Alectrosaurus
 Trionyx
 Aspideretes
 "Antarctosaurus" jaxartensis (Sauropod indet.) - "Femur."
 Jaxartosaurus aralensis - "Isolated skull roof and braincase."
 Bactrosaurus prynadai (hadrosaurid indet) "Maxilla, dentary, both with teeth."
 Kazaklambia convincens (lambeosaurine dinosaur)

See also 
 List of dinosaur-bearing rock formations

References

Bibliography 
  

Geologic formations of Kazakhstan
Geologic formations of Tajikistan
Upper Cretaceous Series of Asia
Cretaceous Kazakhstan
Campanian Stage
Santonian Stage
Conglomerate formations
Sandstone formations
Deltaic deposits
Paleontology in Kazakhstan
Paleontology in Tajikistan